Neurogaming is a nascent form of gaming that involves the use of Brain–computer interfaces such as EEG so that users can interact with the game without the need of traditional controllers. It can be used as a novel and engaging type of gameplay, or as a way to create adaptive technology to improve accessibility in gaming. Some use cases show the combination of traditional controllers with direct brain inputs.

Neurogaming is also possible in Multiplayer mode. Some use cases allow players to see the brain activity of other users  while others do not incorporate brain data visualization into the experience. 

Neurogaming can have applications in treating brain disorders like PTSD and ADHD. Besides health industry neurogaming technologies represent interest to other various sectors like defense, sports  and education.

"The player becomes a virtual agent in the game.. In the classroom it translates into a form of differentiated instruction."

One of the earliest neurogames is the racing game NeuroRacer, which was designed by Adam Gazzaley to improve the cognitive functioning of aging adults. Other early neurogames include "Throw Trucks With Your Mind" (which allows users to pick up and throw objects by mentally blocking distractions) and NeuroMage, which allows users to use a "relax the mind" technique to learn new spells and levitate the Millennium Falcon.

Among possible dangers and concerns surrounding neurogaming are ethical issues like mind control, brain intrusion and mind reading.

References

Gaming